Wriothesley Russell may refer to:

 Wriothesley Russell, 2nd Duke of Bedford (1680–1711) 
 Wriothesley Russell, 3rd Duke of Bedford (1708–1732)
 Reverend Lord Wriothesley Russell (1804–1886)